The 1952 UCI Road World Championships took place in Luxembourg, Luxembourg between 23–24 August 1952.

Events Summary

References

 
UCI Road World Championships by year
W
R
R
Sports competitions in Luxembourg City
1950s in Luxembourg City
UCI Road World Championships